Hicksville Township is one of the twelve townships of Defiance County, Ohio, United States. The 2010 census found 4,979 people in the township, 1,398 of whom lived in the unincorporated portions of the township.

Geography
Located in the southwestern corner of the county along the Indiana line, it borders the following townships:
Milford Township - north
Farmer Township - northeast corner
Mark Township - east
Crane Township, Paulding County - southeast corner
Carryall Township, Paulding County - south
Scipio Township, Allen County, Indiana - southwest
Newville Township, DeKalb County, Indiana - west

The village of Hicksville is located in western Hicksville Township.

Name and history
Hicksville Township was organized in 1839. It is the only Hicksville Township statewide.

Government
The township is governed by a three-member board of trustees, who are elected in November of odd-numbered years to a four-year term beginning on the following January 1. Two are elected in the year after the presidential election and one is elected in the year before it. There is also an elected township fiscal officer, who serves a four-year term beginning on April 1 of the year after the election, which is held in November of the year before the presidential election. Vacancies in the fiscal officership or on the board of trustees are filled by the remaining trustees.

Transportation
Three state highways travel through Hicksville Township, all of which meet in the village of Hicksville near Antwerp:
State Route 2, which travels from northeast to southwest
State Route 18, which travels from northwest to east
State Route 49, which travels generally from north to south

References

External links
County website

Townships in Defiance County, Ohio
Townships in Ohio